John Miller is a British literary historian. He has worked at the University of Sheffield since 2012.

Selected publications

Authored books
Miller, John (2012). Empire and the Animal Body: Violence, Identity and Ecology in Victorian Adventure Fiction. Anthem Press.
Miller, John, and Louise Miller (2014). Walrus. Reaktion Books.
Miller, John (2021). The Philosophy of Tattoos. British Library Publishing.
Miller, John (2022). The Heart of the Forest: Why Woods Matter. British Library Publishing.

Edited books
Lyons, Paddy, Willy Maley, and John Miller, eds. (2013). Romantic Ireland from Tone to Gonne: Fresh Perspectives on Nineteenth-Century Ireland. Cambridge Scholars Publishing.
Miller, John, and Mariangela Palladino, eds. (2015). The Globalization of Space: Foucault and Heterotopia. Routledge.
Hutchings, Kevin, and John Miller, eds. (2016). Transatlantic Literary Ecologies: Nature and Culture in the Nineteenth-Century Anglophone Atlantic World. Routledge.
McKay, Robert, and John Miller, eds. (2017). Werewolves, Wolves and the Gothic. University of Wales Press.
McCorry, Seán, and John Miller, eds. (2019). Literature and Meat Since 1900. Palgrave Macmillan.
Miller, John, ed. (2019). Tales of the Tattooed: An Anthology of Ink. British Library Publishing.
Miller, John, ed. (2020). Weird Woods: Tales from the Haunted Forests of Britain. British Library Publishing.
McHugh, Susan, Robert McKay, and John Miller, eds. (2021). The Palgrave Handbook of Animals and Literature. Palgrave Macmillan.

References

Living people
Year of birth missing (living people)
Academics of the University of Sheffield
English literary historians
British academics of English literature